The Arthur B. Guise Medal is awarded annually by the Society of Fire Protection Engineers and recognizes eminent achievement in the advancement of the science and technology of fire protection engineering. It is named in memory of the achievements of Arthur Guise.

Recipients 
Source: SFPE

See also 

 List of general science and technology awards 
 List of civil awards and decorations#Fire service awards and honors
 List of occupational health and safety awards
 List of awards named after people

References 

Fire protection
Fire prevention
Firefighters
Building engineering
Fire service awards and honors
Wildfires
Occupational safety and health awards
Lists of award winners
Engineering awards